Unakite is an metamorphic rock that is altered granite composed of pink orthoclase feldspar, green epidote, and generally colorless quartz.

Discovery
It was first found in the United States in the Unaka mountain range of North Carolina from which it gets its name. Unakite exists in various shades of green and pink and is usually mottled in appearance.

Use
A good quality unakite is considered a semiprecious stone; it will take a good polish and is often used in jewelry as beads or cabochons and other lapidary work such as eggs, spheres and animal carvings.  It is also referred to as epidotized or epidote granite.

Structure
In some of the Blue Ridge occurrences, an epidotized augen gneiss is present exhibiting foliation structures. 

The dominant green epidote in unakite rocks is the metasomatic  alteration product of plagioclase feldspar, while the orthoclase and quartz crystals remain unaffected.

Distribution
Unakite can be found as pebbles and cobbles from glacial drift in the beach rock on the shores of Lake Superior.  It also occurs in Virginia where it is found in the river valleys after having been washed down from the Blue Ridge Mountains.  Unakite is not limited to the United States, and has also been reported in South Africa, Sierra Leone, Brazil, China and Australia

Some material labeled unakite lacks the feldspar and is more properly called epidosite, and is also used as beads and cabochons.

References

R. V. Dietrich Gemrocks: Unakite
Unakite on Geology.com
Unakite on Gemdat.org
Granite
Gemstones